The Yamaha YZ450F is a four-stroke racing motocross bike built by Yamaha Motor Corporation. It was the successor to the previous YZ426F which was discontinued in 2003. It is credited by Cycle World and Dirt Rider magazines as the bike that started the four-stroke dirt bike revolution. The 2006 YZ250F and YZ450F were the first production motorcycles equipped with titanium suspension springs.

The WR450F is the enduro version of the YZ450F.

Introduction
For many years, the motocross world almost exclusively used two-stroke engines. AMA racing classes had two classes: 125 cc and 250 cc two-strokes, with no provision for four strokes. Most riders considered four-stroke engine technology to be largely utilitarian and uncompetitive, relegated solely for trail riding.

In 1996, the AMA changed racing rules to allow 450 cc four strokes to compete in the same racing class as 250 cc two-strokes. Yamaha engineer Yoshiharu Nakayama first came up with the idea of creating the first competitive four-stroke race motocross bike. The Yamaha YZ400F was developed to fit into this category. It solved the power dilemma by borrowing superbike technology and giving the YZ a five-valve head, liquid cooling and a 12.5-1 compression ratio.

In 1997, Yamaha rocked the motocross world with the introduction of the YZ400M prototype, a concept motorcycle which borrowed much technology from road racing. The YZM was far ahead of all competition among four-stroke motocross bikes. Doug Henry piloted the YZ400M to its first victory in 1997 at the Las Vegas Supercross. This was the first time any four-stroke had won an AMA event. The YZ400M was the predecessor of the production YZ400F, which was released the next year.

First generation: YZ400F 1998–1999

Yamaha introduced the YZ400F in production in 1998 after a successful AMA season in 1997. It was "the first modern production four-stroke motocrosser that was directly competitive against two-strokes." Initially, Yamaha targeted a dry weight of 233 pounds (106 kg) (on par with the 250 two-strokes of the time), but by production, the bike weighed 250 pounds. The bike had an 11,600 rpm redline power and torque close to its 250 cc two-stroke rivals. It benefited from engine compression braking, which allowed the engine to slow the bike down during deceleration, giving the brakes a rest.  The 1998 YZ400F was the first bike to come stock with a Keihin FCR carburetor.

In 1998, Doug Henry won the AMA National Motocross Championship aboard the YZF, becoming the first rider to win a championship on a four-stroke motorcycle. This victory is considered by some to be the major turning point in the motocross world—for the first time, four strokes were considered a competitive racing machine.

Second generation: YZ426F 2000–2002

In 2000, Yamaha updated the YZ400F, increasing the displacement to 426 cc for greater power and throttle response. In addition, the carburetor and jets were updated to ease the YZ400F's starting woes.

The next year, in 2001, Yamaha replaced the previous steel valves with titanium ones. The new valves were more than forty percent lighter than the previous valves, allowing for lighter and softer valve springs, in turn allowing a quicker revving engine, improved throttle response, higher rev ceilings, and more power. The crankshaft was also reshaped and the whole assembly was redesigned for quicker throttle response and, Yamaha claimed, "less high-end horsepower loss." In addition to motor modifications, a few changes were made to the transmission to help contain the power and ensure longevity. The suspension also received a bit of an overhaul with the goal being reduced weight and smoother action throughout the stroke. Yamaha also designed a new exhaust pipe design so that exhaust header removal would no longer be required when replacing the oil filter.  Carburetor tuning was modified to deal with starting and off-idle take off difficulties.

Also in 2001 the subframe was changed from a steel to a blue painted aluminum style.  In 2002 the blue painting was stopped and left to a bare aluminum look. Motorcycle.com says that "The gas tank is reasonably thin and allows good forward and backward movement while providing something nicely shaped to hold onto with your knees. In fact, the entire ergonomic package on this YZF is well thought out. The handlebars have a nice bend to them and are well-placed for good rider control and legroom. The footpegs are well-made units with a wide platform and sit in a position that keeps them from dragging in ruts without cramping a rider's legs."

In 2002 Yamaha remapped the digital CD ignition system which delivers a more precise spark and optimal timing for faster, stronger response during hard acceleration, and less kickback during starting. Also an all-new swing-arm which is lighter and stronger for reduced weight, greater rigidity and more compliant rear suspension action. While an anodized finish gives the bike a tricked out look. The 426 also includes a larger pivot shift for increased durability. A larger rear brake disc was also added which means greater stopping power.

Third generation YZ450F 2003–2005

For 2003, the YZF received the biggest update in its history. Next, the frame and plastic were updated for a new, sleeker look. The bike made tremendous power; however, many thought that the bike had too much power for a motocross track.
The 2005 YZ450F was the first YZ450F to feature KYB twin chamber cartridge forks.

Fourth generation YZ450F 2006–2009

The YZ450F received a major update in 2006, with over 300 parts changed and improved. The power was smoothed out, and the bike was made easier to ride, putting to rest the complaint that the YZ had too much power. The transmission was returned to a more traditional five-speed. An all-new aluminum single backbone frame shaved another 10 pounds off the weight.

The 2006 saw KYB SSS forks.

2007 saw camshaft and exhaust changes, moving power from low-RPMs to mid-RPMs.  2008-2009 furthered pushed the powerband towards the mid-RPMs.

Fifth generation YZ450F 2010–2013 

September 8, 2009, Yamaha introduced its all-new YZ450F with fuel injection. The engine cylinder is rearward slanted, the crank rod angle has been changed to provide a more complete combustion, the 5-valve head is now a 4-valve head, the gas tank is located under the seat, the exhaust pipe exits the rear of the cylinder, and the air intake is now in the front of the bike. They have a new bi-lateral frame which allows for new improved steering and the new engine components. The entire package comes together to create a bike that is mass-centralized. The bike was introduced by Yamaha Factory Motocross rider James Stewart Jr. The top speed has been recorded at 80 mph stock.

Sixth generation YZ450F 2014–2017 

The 2014 YZ450F was a new design the retained the backwards slant engine.  The 2014 model has a wet-sump engine and an easy access air filter.

Seventh generation YZ450F 2018–Present 

The 2018 YZ450F features electric start and a Mikuni fuel injection system. The kickstarter was removed for this generation.

References

External links
 The Long History of Reverse-Cylinder Engine Designs - motocrossactionmag.com

YZ450F
Off-road motorcycles
Motorcycles introduced in 1998